Noble Bennet Pickett (January 19, 1801 – February 5, 1884) was an American physician.

Pickett, the eldest son of Bennet and Sarah (Giddings) Pickett, was born, January 19, 1801, in Sherman, then the North Society in New Fairfield, Conn.  In his early manhood, he spent ten years in teaching, while at the same time pursuing his own studies, in medicine and other subjects.  He graduated from Yale Medical School in 1834.  In the September after his graduation he was married to Laura Giddings, of Sherman.  He then settled in professional practice in North East, Duchess County, N. Y., but a year later at the urgent request of friends removed to Great Barrington, Mass., where the rest of his life was spent. His medical skill and his earnest religious character made him much beloved. He was also specially interested in the educational work of the town. He served as a member of the Massachusetts State Legislature during two sessions, in 1851 and 1852. His public services were cut short by blindness, which overtook him about 1870.  During the last ten years of his life he also suffered much from epileptic seizures. He died suddenly at the house of his only child, a daughter, in Great Barrington, February 5, 1884, in his 84th year.

External links
 

1801 births
1884 deaths
People from Sherman, Connecticut
Yale School of Medicine alumni
19th-century American physicians
Members of the Massachusetts General Court
19th-century American politicians